Tinbe may refer to:
 Tinbé, Ivory Coast, a town
 Tinbe, the shield used in the tinbe-rochin weapon system of Okinawa, Japan

See also 
 Timbe (disambiguation)